Jazbaat is a 1980 Bollywood romantic drama film directed and written by Suraj Prakash and starring Raj Babbar, Bhagwan and Zarina Wahab.

Cast
 Raj Babbar as Inspector Kumar
 Zarina Wahab as  Sapna / Sangeeta
 Savita Bajaj as Jamuna
 Bhagwan as Francis
 Shail Chaturvedi as Havaldar Pandey
 Dinesh Hingoo as Havaldar Ram Prasad
 P. Jairaj
 Jankidas as Sapna's victim
 Viju Khote as Sapna's victim
 Leela Mishra as Sapna's Mausi
 Moolchand as Sapna's victim
 Rajendra Nath as  Kulwant Singh
 Shashi Puri as Deepak
 Subbiraj as Ram Mohan
 T.P. Jain as J.P.

References

External links
 

1980 films
Films scored by Raj Kamal
1980s Hindi-language films
1980 crime drama films
Rajshri Productions films
Indian romantic drama films